The first edition of the European Short Course Championships was held in Rostock, Germany, from December 13 to December 15, 1996. The event, just a couple of months after the Summer Olympics in Atlanta, Georgia, replaced the European Sprint Swimming Championships, where only the 50 m events and the 100 m individual medley were at stake. From this edition on, also the events longer than that were contested.

Medal table

Medal summary

Men's events

Women's events

References
 Results on GBRSports.com

1996 in swimming
Swim
1996
International aquatics competitions hosted by Germany
Swimming competitions in Germany
European Short Course Swimming Championships
Sport in Rostock
Sports competitions in Mecklenburg-Western Pomerania
1990s in Mecklenburg-Western Pomerania